Mark Wrathall (born 1965) is Professor of Philosophy at the University of Oxford and a fellow and tutor at Corpus Christi College, Oxford.  He is considered a leading interpreter of the philosophy of Martin Heidegger.  Wrathall is featured in Tao Ruspoli's film Being in the World. According to a recent reviewer of Wrathall's latest book, "Wrathall's writing is clear and comprehensive, ranging across virtually all of Heidegger's collected works.... Wrathall's overall interpretation of Heidegger's work is crystal clear, compelling, and relevant."

Education and career
Mark Wrathall received a BA in philosophy at Brigham Young University in 1988.  In 1991, he received both a Juris Doctor from Harvard and an MA in philosophy from Boston College.  After clerking for Judge Cecil F. Poole at the U.S. Court of Appeals for the Ninth Circuit, he pursued a Ph.D. in philosophy from the University of California at Berkeley, graduating in 1996, where he was a student of the Heidegger scholar Hubert Dreyfus.  From 1994 to 1996 he was a teaching fellow at Stanford Law School.  He taught at Brigham Young University from 1996 to 2006 (first in the political science department, then from 1999 in the philosophy department).  From 2006 to 2017, he was a professor at the University of California, Riverside.

Philosophical work
Wrathall's main interests include phenomenology, existentialism, the phenomenology of religion, and the philosophy of law, but he is best known for his work on Martin Heidegger.

Wrathall has also contributed to the philosophy of popular culture, editing a book on the philosophical themes found in the music of U2 and publishing essays on film and philosophy.  Wrathall's work on popular culture intersects with his interests in religion.  He draws on Heidegger, Kierkegaard, and Nietzsche to describe how secularism and technology undermine belief in objective eternal meanings and values.  But Wrathall thinks nihilism also "opens up access to richer and more relevant ways for us to understand creation and for us to encounter the divine and the sacred."

Books
2000  Heidegger, Coping and Cognitive Science (MIT Press) - editor with Jeff Malpas
2000 Heidegger, Authenticity and Modernity (MIT Press) - editor with Jeff Malpas
2000 Appropriating Heidegger (Cambridge University Press) - editor with James E. Faulconer
2002 Heidegger Reexamined (Routledge) - editor with Hubert Dreyfus
2003 Religion After Metaphysics (Cambridge University Press) - editor
2005 How to Read Heidegger (Granta; W. W. Norton)
2005 A Companion to Heidegger - editor with Hubert Dreyfus
2006 U2 and Philosophy (Open Court) - editor 
2006 A Companion to Phenomenology and Existentialism - editor with Hubert Dreyfus
2008 U2 ea Filosofia (Madras) - editor
2009 Die Philosophie bei U2 (Wiley-VCH) - editor
2010 Heidegger and Unconcealment: Truth, Language, History (Cambridge University Press)
2013 The Cambridge Companion to Heidegger's Being and Time (Cambridge University Press) - editor

2020 The Cambridge Heidegger Lexicon (Cambridge University Press) - editor

References

External links
 Personal Homepage
 Homepage at Being in the World Movie Website
 Homepage at UCR Philosophy Department Website

1965 births
Living people
Continental philosophers
Phenomenologists
Philosophers of law
21st-century American philosophers
Heidegger scholars
Harvard Law School alumni
Brigham Young University alumni
Morrissey College of Arts & Sciences alumni
UC Berkeley College of Letters and Science alumni
Brigham Young University faculty
University of California, Riverside faculty